Strawberry Reservoir is a large reservoir in the U.S. state of Utah. It is Utah's most popular fishery, receiving over 1.5 million angling hours annually and is part of the Blue Ribbon Fisheries program. Game fish in the reservoir include sterilized rainbow trout, bear lake cutthroat trout, kokanee salmon and crayfish.
The reservoir is situated in Strawberry Valley.  This valley is normally part of the Colorado River drainage.  The dam was constructed to divert water into Utah Valley.

Strawberry Reservoir was the 2006 recipient of the American Fisheries Society's outstanding sport fish development/restoration Project of the Year award.

Soldier Creek Dam
The original Strawberry Dam was constructed by the Bureau in 1913, about eight miles upstream of the current location, then deliberately breached in 1985.

History
Strawberry Reservoir was poisoned (chemically treated) in 1990 to kill all aquatic life in the lake in attempt to get rid of trash fish, specifically the Utah chub.  Shortly after replanting the fish, Utah Chub began to appear.  The DWR (Division of Wildlife Resources) found that the Bonneville Cutthroat trout (Bear Lake Strain) was a very aggressive chub-eating fish.  The DWR has used the Cutthroat trout to keep the number of Chub down in the lake.  The fishing and angling regulations for Strawberry are very strict regarding the possession, release and quantity of Native Cutthroat an angler is allowed to keep.

However, anglers are continually encouraged to voluntarily release all cutthroat trout, regardless of size. Additionally, the 2021 DWR regulations for the waterbody indicate that "Any trout with cutthroat characteristics (not necessarily jaw slashing) is considered to be a cutthroat trout."

Clearing of the banks of the reservoir's major tributary, the Strawberry River, over the course of the 20th century for grazing purposes has caused naturally occurring phosphorus to become washed into the river and deposited in levels unhealthy to wildlife in the reservoir. An extensive restoration program to re-plant grasses and trees along the banks of the entire river was expected to be completed in 2010. However, the project did not reach completion until 2019. The USFS will continue to monitor the area for weeds and weed treatments will continue, as needed. To improve sage grouse nesting and brood-rearing habitats, these areas will be accessed and treatments will be proposed where appropriate. Grazing will still be allowed where it is currently in place.

Major fishing areas
Strawberry Reservoir contains four major fishing areas. The largest, at 64 percent of the reservoir's volume, is the Strawberry Basin, which includes the original  Reservoir. The Meadows, located at the southern end of the reservoir south of the Indian Creek Dike, fills a valley of the lower Indian Creek Drainage. Soldier Creek Basin, the deepest fishing area, includes the old Soldier Creek Reservoir, and contains Stinking Springs and Soldier Creek Bay. The Narrows lies between Strawberry and Soldier Creek and includes the drainage channels of the Strawberry River and Indian Creek.

Aquatic life
 Bonneville cutthroat trout (Bear Lake Strain) - Oncorhynchus clarki utah
 Rainbow trout - Oncorhynchus mykiss
 Kokanee salmon - Oncorhynchus nerka
 Crayfish (commonly called Crawdads)
 Utah chub - Gila atraria

References

External links

Strawberry Reservoir - Utah Division of Wildlife Resources
Utah Outdoor Activities
Strawberry Fishing Info

Reservoirs in Utah
Lakes of Wasatch County, Utah
Buildings and structures in Wasatch County, Utah
Tourist attractions in Wasatch County, Utah
Wasatch Range
1913 establishments in Utah